The Montana Grizzlies football (commonly referred to as the "Griz") program represents the University of Montana in the Division I Football Championship Subdivision (FCS) of college football. The Grizzlies have competed in the Big Sky Conference since 1963, where it is a founding member. They play their home games on campus in Missoula at Washington–Grizzly Stadium, where they had an average attendance of 25,377 in 2016.

The Grizzlies had an unprecedented streak of 25 consecutive winning seasons from 1986 to 2011, and this included runs to the NCAA FCS (formerly Division I-AA) championship seven times. In Washington-Grizzly Stadium, they have a winning percentage of .890 which includes the playoffs. They hold the records for most playoff appearances in a row (17), Big Sky Conference titles in a row (12), and overall playoff appearances (19). Their success made them the most successful program in all of college football in the 2000s (119 wins) and third most successful team in FCS in the 1990s (93 wins). On September 4, 2021, Montana upset the #20 (FBS) Washington Huskies at Husky Stadium in Seattle, Washington.

History

Early years (1897–1934)
The University of Montana's first football season was in 1897, where they won a single game against future rival Montana State. The team played only schools from Montana until it helped found the Northwest Intercollegiate Athletic Association (NWIAA) in 1902. In addition to Montana, this original Northwest Conference included Washington, Washington State, Oregon, Oregon State, Idaho, and Whitman College. Despite the association's stated goal of increasing intercollegiate athletics, Montana continued to play only the nearest teams. Unfortunately, the team would not win a game against a conference opponent until a 10-0 win over Washington State in 1914.

In 1915, the Northwest Conference had become superfluous with the creation of the Pacific Coast Conference, which by 1924 already included the five public Northwest Conference schools from Washington, Oregon, and Idaho, in addition to California and Stanford. Montana joined the conference in 1924 and remained there through the 1949 season. Montana won only nine conferences games ( against rival Idaho), and never played a home game against a team from the state of California.

No team was organized in 1918, due to World War I and the 1918 flu pandemic.

Doug Fessenden era (1935–1948)
(46–40–4) Record, (9–1) vs. Cats
Doug Fessenden was the first Montana coach to last more than five years, and of those who coached more than two years, he was the first to end his career with a winning record.

The program was on hiatus for the 1943 and 1944 seasons, due to World War II. Of the six teams in the northern division of the PCC, only Washington continued through the war.

Mountain States (Skyline) Conference era (1951–1961)
In 1948, the Montana board of education announced that it was de-emphasizing athletics at the state university. Key to the university's decision was the feeling that continued affiliation with the PCC was incompatible with the goal to "keep intercollegiate athletics properly subordinated to the academic function" and they would "seek to develop competition in all sports with institutions similar in purpose, size, resources and academic standing." The conference was only "preferable to having no conference affiliation."

In 1951, Montana joined the Mountain States Conference, popularly known as the Skyline Conference, and competed there until the conference dissolved in the summer of 1962. The Grizzlies never had a winning season in the Skyline and never won more than three games until 1960. In 1963, Montana joined Gonzaga, Idaho, Idaho State, Weber State, and Montana State in forming the Big Sky Conference. (Gonzaga dropped its football program after 1941 and Idaho did not compete in conference play until 1965.)

Jack Swarthout era (1967–1975)
(51–41–1) Record, (3–6) vs. Cats
Montana's football struggles continued in the new Big Sky Conference, and the team had only won nine games in its first four seasons when school officials decided that a coaching change was needed. Following a 1–9 season in 1966, University of Montana president Robert T. Pantzer announced in December the hiring of Jack Swarthout, a former quarterback/halfback/end from Montana. Swarthout brought on Jack Elway as an assistant and they improved the team immediately to 7–3 in their first season. Within two years, Swarthout guided the team to back-to-back undefeated regular seasons in 1969 and 1970, and Montana's first Big Sky Conference titles. At the end of both years, they were defeated by North Dakota State in the Camellia Bowl, which was part of a set of bowls that determined the NCAA Football Championship Subdivision national championship, prior to the current FCS playoff structure.

Continued success was expected, but a disappointing season in 1971 was followed by a work-study scandal that eventually led to Swarthout's resignation. In 1972, a federal grand jury returned a 32-count indictment charging five university officials and coaches (including Swarthout) with conspiring to illegally use federal-aid money to pay for fictitious jobs for athletes. Though Swarthout was found not guilty, the charges hurt recruiting and the student-body government decided to withdraw financial support for athletic programs. Despite the controversy and resultant performance decline, Swarthout is credited as being the coach that turned Montana into a winning football program.

Don Read era (1986–1995)
(85–36) Record, (10–0) vs. Cats
After Swarthout's departure, Montana would register only one winning season over the next 10 years. In November 1985, Montana fired coach Larry Donovan and replaced him with Portland State's head coach, Don Read. Over the next 10 years, Montana would go 85-36, have 10 straight winning seasons, and was undefeated against cross-state rival Montana State. Read would win 2 conference titles, make the FCS playoffs 5 times and win Montana's first national championship.

Mick Dennehy era (1996–1999)
(39–12) record, (4–0) vs. Cats
Mick Dennehy had been the offensive coordinator under Don Read and was promoted to head coach when Read retired in 1995. Dennehy continued Montana's success, making it to the national championship in his first year for a rematch against Marshall University. This time, however, Montana lost 49–29. Montana made the playoffs every year under Dennehy and continued to beat Montana State, but they did not make it past the first round of the playoffs after his first season. After the 1999 season, Dennehy accepted a head coaching position at Utah State.

Joe Glenn era (2000–2002)
(39–6) Record, (2–1) vs. Cats
The Joe Glenn era began with high hopes for the winner of two Division II championships at the University of Northern Colorado. He did not disappoint, making it to the national championship in his first two seasons, where he won it in his second appearance. Unfortunately, during Glenn's third year, Montana's win streak against Montana State finally came to end at 16 straight games. Glenn left after the 2002 season to pursue the head coaching job at the University of Wyoming.

Bobby Hauck era (2003–2009)
(80–17) Record, (5–2) vs. Cats
Bobby Hauck began his tenure in 2003, and over the next 7 years would win a share of the Big Sky Conference title every year. His teams made it to the national championship game three times but lost each game including in 2004 (lost to JMU), 2008 (lost to the University of Richmond), and 2009 (lost to Villanova University). After the 2009 season, Hauck left to take the head coaching job at UNLV. He returned as head coach in 2017 after leaving UNLV and being an assistant for San Diego State.

Robin Pflugrad era (2010–2011)
(13–7) Record, (1–1) vs. Cats
In 2009, Robin Pflugrad returned to Montana to become the wide receivers coach under Bobby Hauck. After that season, Hauck left Montana to become the head coach at UNLV, and Pflugrad was promoted to replace him. Pflugrad said after his hiring that Montana would be "very fast on offense, up-tempo and upbeat." Pflugrad led Montana to a Big Sky Conference title and a national semifinal appearance in 2011, but those were vacated by the NCAA on July 26, 2013 due to infractions which included a nationally publicized rape scandal. Individually, Pflugrad was hit with numerous sanctions by the NCAA for his part in the infractions.

Mick Delaney era (2012–2014)
(24–14) Record, (2–1) vs. Cats
Mick Delaney was hired July 26, 2012, replacing former head coach Robin Pflugrad. On July 26, 2013, the NCAA found the Montana football program guilty of multiple major infractions and one secondary infraction. None of these infractions occurred while Delaney was the head coach. Delaney retired after three seasons.

Bob Stitt era (2015–2017)
(21–14) Record, (1–2) vs. Cats
On December 16, 2014, the university announced that Bob Stitt would be replacing former head coach Mick Delaney after he announced his retirement. Bob Stitt started his tenure at Montana with one of the most memorable games in Griz football history with a 38–35 win over the 4-time Defending FCS National Champions North Dakota State thanks to an 80-yard, 1:37 scoring drive to end the game.

Bobby Hauck era, part two (2018–present)
(25–11) Record, (1–2) vs. Cats
Hauck returned to Montana for the 2018 season. Montana earned its 200th win at home against Sacramento State on September 22, 2018, 41-34.

On September 4, 2021, Montana upset the #20 ranked Washington Huskies. It was their first win against Washington since 1920 and only their second overall win in 20 games against the Huskies. It was also the fifth occasion a FCS team beat a ranked FBS team since the 1978 FBS/FCS split.

Program achievements
The Grizzlies rank among the all-time playoff appearance leaders, with appearances in 1982, 1988, 1989, and 1993–2009. The Grizzlies had a playoff streak of 17 in a row from 1993–2009, which is a record at the I-AA level, now known as Football Championship Subdivision. The streak came to an end on November 21, 2010 when the Grizzlies were not selected to the FCS playoffs following a loss to in-state rival Montana State.

The Grizzlies won the national championship in 1995 under Don Read when Dave Dickenson led the team to a victory over Marshall University in the national championship game. In 2001, coach Joe Glenn led the Montana Grizzlies to another national championship by defeating Furman University, 13-6.

Conference affiliations 
Montana has competed as both an independent and as a conference member throughout its history.

 Independent (1897–1923)
 Pacific Coast Conference (1924–1949)
 Independent (1950)
 Mountain States Conference (1951–1961)
 Independent (1962)
 Big Sky Conference (1963–present)

Championships

National championships

Conference championships
Montana has won 18 conference championships, all in the Big Sky Conference

† Co-champions

Head coaches

† Montana was penalized by the NCAA on July 26, 2013 and forced to vacate its last five wins of the 2011 season. One win was against Montana State. It was also forced to vacate its conference title and appearance in the 2011 FCS playoffs.

Home venues

The Montana Grizzlies have played their home games in Washington–Grizzly Stadium since its construction in 1986. The stadium has an official capacity of 25,203. However, its record attendance is 26,856 which was set on November 20, 2021 with a 29 to 10 smashing defeat of cross state Rivals Montana state Bobcats.  Construction of the stadium closely follows the Grizzlies recent success, and since its construction the Grizzlies have a 218 - 34 record as of 2021 and have gone undefeated 11 times.

Before Washington-Grizzly Stadium, the Grizzlies played off-campus at "new" Dornblaser Field from 1968 to 1986. Prior to 1968, Montana played on-campus at "old" Dornblaser Field from 1920 to 1967. Both stadiums were named for Paul Dornblaser, the team's captain in 1912, who was killed in World War I. Prior to 1920, Montana played its home games at a field in downtown Missoula, near the former Missoulian newspaper building.

Rivalries

Montana State

Montana's primary rivalry is the Brawl of the Wild (AKA: The Cat - Griz game) against Montana State University in Bozeman. The game has been played 121 times, and the Griz lead the series, 73-42-5. Montana State Bobcats won the last meeting 55-21 on November 19, 2022.

The series has three distinct periods. From 1897 to 1916, the teams didn't belong to a conference, but at times would play twice per year. Early seasons had seven games or less, with one season seeing the Grizzlies play just one game. Four of the five ties in the series came during this era. Montana won 12 games to Montana State's 7.

In 1917, Montana State joined the Rocky Mountain Athletic Conference (RMAC). In 1924, Montana joined what is now the Pac-12 Conference when it entered the Pacific Coast Conference. The RMAC included several teams that would become Mountain West Conference members. When MSU joined the RMAC, it included Colorado, Colorado State, Utah, Utah State, and Brigham Young. When UM joined the PCC, it included Stanford, California, UCLA, USC, Oregon, Oregon State, Washington, Washington State, and Idaho. The Bobcats remained in the RMAC through 1956, while the Grizzlies remained in the PCC through 1949. Montana joined the Mountain States Conference from 1951–1961. MSU was independent from 1957–1962 and UM was independent in 1950 and 1962. During this period UM, enjoyed a 30-8-1 edge in Griz-Cat games.

Both schools entered the Big Sky Conference as charter members in 1963, with Montana holding a 42-15-2 series lead. From 1963 to 1985, Montana State enjoyed its most successful period of the Griz - Cat rivalry. MSU won 17 games to just six for UM. Following that, Montana started "The Streak" when it won 16 straight games from 1986 to 2001. Montana holds a 31-27 lead in the series during the Big Sky era.

 Montana was penalized by the NCAA on July 26, 2013 and forced to vacate its last five wins of the 2011 season. One win was against Montana State.

Idaho

Montana formerly played a rivalry game against the Idaho Vandals for the Little Brown Stein. The Grizzlies trail in the 84-game series 28-55-2 (.333), but have won the last five meetings (2000–03, 2018). (Idaho moved up to Division I-A (now FBS) in 1996.)

The Montana-Idaho rivalry resumed during the 2018 season when Idaho returned to the Big Sky Conference as a full member.  Montana won the game at Idaho, 46-27.

Eastern Washington

The Grizzlies also have an annual rivalry game in conference with the Eastern Washington Eagles, called the EWU–UM Governors Cup. Montana leads the series 27-16-1. The teams are not scheduled to meet in 2018, ending an annual series that dates from 1982 to 2017.

Uniforms

Colors
Maroon & Silver     (1893–1967, 1997–present) 
Copper & Gold       (1968–1996)

The official school colors of the University of Montana are copper, silver, and gold; these were chosen in recognition of the state's mining history. Contrary to popular perception, these colors have never changed, with the confusion stemming from the university's decision to represent "copper" with either maroon  or "Texas orange"  at various times in its history.

When the university was founded in 1893 and its colors were chosen, a lack of copper dye led the school to use maroon, and occasionally other colors, to represent copper. This had the effect of having the school's athletic teams not always being represented across the board by the same uniform colors. In 1967, head football coach and athletic director Jack Swarthout, who personally preferred the maroon and silver used by the football team, sought to make the schools colors more consistent and held a vote among UM coaches. They selected Texas orange (burnt orange to represent copper) and yellow gold to be used on the school's uniforms and it remained for the next 30 years.

The maroon was brought back in 1993 as part of the university's centennial celebrations and a student survey in 1995 showed support for a return to maroon and silver uniforms. Despite some vocal opposition, by 1997, the colors began to phase into the maroon and silver that are used.

#37 Jersey
The #37 Jersey is a tradition that began in 1987 by then-running back Kraig Paulson. The tradition holds that whoever wears the #37 jersey selects an in-state recruit and leading defensive player to wear it next.

Postseason results

College Division / Division II
Formerly in the University Division, Montana moved down to the College Division for football in 1963 with the formation of the Big Sky Conference. The College Division concluded the season with four regional bowls, played in December after the final polls were released. The undefeated Grizzlies played in the Camellia Bowl in 1969 and 1970, but lost both to North Dakota State in Sacramento, California.

Division II debuted in 1973 and introduced a playoff system; Montana and the Big Sky moved to the new Division I-AA in 1978.

Division I-AA/FCS Playoffs
The Grizzlies have appeared in the I-AA/FCS playoffs 26 times with a record of 37–25. However, their 2011 appearance has been vacated, reducing their official playoff record to 35–24 in 25 appearances. With seven trips to the title game in fifteen seasons, they were national champions twice (1995, 2001) and runner–up five times (1996, 2000, 2004, 2008, 2009).

†

All-Americans

Bill Kelly, QB- 1925 (BEHR 1st team) (College Football Hall of Fame)
Bill Kelly, QB- 1926 (CP-2nd team; RG-2nd team; WE-3rd team ) (College Football Hall of Fame) 
Bill Kelly, HB- 1926 (AP-2nd Team [as HB]; BE-3rd team [as HB]) (College Football Hall of Fame) 
Stan Renning, G- 1957 (INS-2nd team)
Stan Renning, G- 1958 (AP 3rd team)

College Football Hall of Fame

"Wild Bill" Kelly was a masterful open field runner who darted and dodged his way to electrifying gains. During his junior and senior seasons he had five kickoff returns for touchdowns, two on runs of more than 90 yards. In 1971 Kelly was named quarterback for the Shrine Game's College All-Star All-time Team.

Individual awards and honors

National honors—players

Walter Payton Award
National Offensive Player of the Year
1995: Dave Dickenson

Walter Payton Award finalists
1989: Tim Hauck
1996: Brian Ah Yat
1997: Brian Ah Yat
1998: Brian Ah Yat
1999: Drew Miller
2001: Yohance Humphery
2002: John Edwards
2004: Craig Ochs
2005: Lex Hilliard
2009: Chase Reynolds

Buck Buchanan Award
National Defensive Player of the Year
2007: Kroy Biermann
2019: Dante Olson
Buck Buchanan Award finalists
2000: Andy Petek (Runner-up)
2001: Vince Huntsberger (Runner-up)
2002: Trey Young
2006: Kroy Biermann
2011: Trumaine Johnson
2012: Jordan Tripp
2013: Jordan Tripp

STATS FCS Defensive Player of the Year
2015: Tyrone Holmes

National Football Foundation National Scholar-Athlete Award

National honors—coaches

American Football Coaches Association (AFCA)
National Coach of the Year
1995: Don Read

Amos Alonzo Stagg Award
1958: Bernie Bierman

Eddie Robinson Award
National Coach of the Year
2002: Joe Glenn

Big Sky Conference honors

Offensive MVP
1993: Dave Dickenson, QB
1994: Dave Dickenson, QB
1995: Dave Dickenson, QB
1996: Brian Ah Yat, QB
1998: Brian Ah Yat, QB
2002: John Edwards, QB

Defensive MVP
1974: Ron Rosenberg, LB
1976: Greg Anderson, DB
1988: Tim Hauck, DB
1989: Tim Hauck, DB
1996: Jason Crebo, LB
1999: Vince Huntsberger, SS
2000: Andy Petek, DE
2001: Vince Huntsberger, SS
2002: Trey Young, FS
2007: Kroy Biermann, DE
2011: Caleb McSurdy, LB
2019: Dante Olson, LB (co-player of the year)

Top Newcomer
1999: Drew Miller, QB
2003: Justin Green, RB
2018: Dalton Sneed, QB
2019: Marcus Knight, RB
2021: Justin Ford, CB

Coach of the Year
1969: Jack Swarthout
1970: Jack Swarthout
1989: Don Read
1993: Don Read
1995: Don Read
1996: Mick Dennehy
2000: Joe Glenn
2001: Joe Glenn
2002: Joe Glenn
2006: Bobby Hauck
2007: Bobby Hauck
2009: Bobby Hauck
2011: Robin Pflugrad

Other awards and honors
Grizzlies quarterback Bob O'Billovich was selected as the Montana Athlete of Decade (1960–1970)

Program alumni who played professionally

Future non-conference opponents 
Schedule as of January 4, 2021.

References

External links

Grizzly football yearbooks, 1939–2018
Grizzly football game day programs, 1914–2012

 
American football teams established in 1897
1897 establishments in Montana